Ibo Bonilla Oconitrillo (born 23 January 1951) is an architect, sculptor, mathematician and educator of Costa Rica. He has Costa Rican and Spanish nationality.

He is known mainly because of the creation of Bioclimatic Buildings and his Monuments in Public Square.

Biography

Ibo Bonilla, known as “Professor Ibo”, was born in Sarchí, a town of Alajuela recognized as the cradle of Art in Costa Rica. He has traveled all around the world, carried out different jobs, and graduated in different professions: he is an Architect, Sculptor, Mathematic, and Pedagogue of the Costa Rica University, Technician in Management and Evaluation of Quality from the Polytechnical University of Valencia, Spain, and a master's degree in Businesses Administration from the European Businesses School of Spain.
At this moment he counsels a Consultant Engineers Company   and works for his own Architecture Company.

He is the first graduated Architect in Costa Rica, 1977 (before, they did it out of Costa Rica) and the first Costa Rican Architect incorporated as an Architect in Spain.

Professional career

Architect
In the academic field, the definition of architecture given by Ibo Bonilla has become a benchmark: “Architecture is to sculpture the space in order to satisfy physical, emotional, and spiritual needs, protecting the results with a harmonic skin possessing aesthetic, techniques, and place, from the moment it is performed.” “Architecture is to model social meta-skin with art.” “… When the skin becomes preponderant due to its aesthetic value, it tends to be sculpture, if the predominance is technical, it tends to be construction engineering, if the emphasis is the location, it tends to be landscaping, if there is harmony amongst all the systems, we are in the presence of a very good architectural work. Each work has its proportion and the right measure is the work of the architect, that if there is a dialogue and synthesis of poetic synergism, then we have a work of art.”

His works are between the following sectors:

Public Buildings

Latin American of Science and Technology University (ULACIT), Central American Roche Headquarters, Bank of Cathay of Costa Rica, Ocony’s Companies, Radiotherapy Center of Irazú, Ibero  American Hospital, Ibero American Geriatric Clinic, Sea and Sun Condominium, 352 Figurama Cosmetic Clinics, several Clinics for National Institute of Insurances, etc.

Houses

More than 2 million square meters in residences of all type, cost, location, singularity and level.

Urban renovation

Total Remodeling of Central Bank of Costa Rica, International Bank of Costa Rica, Culture Square, Gold Pre-Columbian Museum, Square and Sculptural Garden of the Central Bank of Costa Rica, Walk of National Hero of the University Estatal a Distancia, Costa Rican Square of Justice, etc.

Bioclimatic architecture and Landscape
Scientific Center Tropical OET, Experience Tropical Cultural Center, Latin American University of Science and Technology (ULACIT), Wilson Botanical Garden and  Cruces Biological Station, Natural Reserve the Marta, Botanical Garden Cusingas, Professors Recreational Center, Kekoldi Ornithological Observatory, National Park of Corcovado, Manuel Antonio National Park, Braulio Carrillo National Park,  Guayabo Archeological Park, Coco’s Island Museum and laboratories, etc.

Works with emphasis in ecological tourism, and rural tourism
More than 30 echo-tourist stations with different type from physical and logistic infrastructure in indigenous communities and farmers located around to National Parks and Natural Reserves, like Buenos Aires de Talamanca, Yorkín de Bribrí, Kekoldi de Talamanca, Carbon Dos Farm, El Silencio Dominical, La Marta Farm in  Turrialba, Tres Colinas of Potrero Grande, Zeta Trece of San Carlos, Bijagua de Upala, El Toro Waterfalls in Sarchí, etc.

Sculptor
His sculpture works or pieces are located in public Parks, museums, galleries and private collections in different parts of the world. Their themes are the tropical biodiversity, the feelings, the near perception and the woman.
His works are made with different techniques and materials: carving of wood, to sculpt stone and metal; molding in clay and drained later in different materials; experiments with different products like glass, quartz, lava, resins, ceramics, iron and cement, etc.

He has specialized in medium format (of 70 to 200 centimeters of height) for interiors and big format with monumental sculptures and sculptural walls.

He has participated in several collective and individual exhibitions, as well as in multiple workshops and seminaries of painting and sculpture in Costa Rica and Spain.

Among his well-known works are:
“El Obelisko Fi”, that is a melt statue in bronze and that represents the National Prize of Architecture, granted every two years by the School of Architects of Costa Rica,
“ Cercanías”, a sculpture of 3.80 meters of height that is in the Sculpture Park of Barva next to recognized works of sculptors  of several countries,
“Naturaleza Asediada”, lava sculpture, articulated in two pieces exposed in the museums of the Plaza de la Cultura Museumn in San José, Costa Rica,
"Amar y Brio”, two Diorita rocks sculptures, with 2 meters of height, located in the entrance to Puebla Real Condominium  in Heredia, Costa Rica.
"Spiral of Success", a set of three steel sculptures located in Terra Campus, Tres Ríos.  With 17.8m (58.4 feet), it is the highest in Costa Rica. While it is claimed to be inspired by the "Flower of Life" and related symbols (Seed of Life, Fruit of Life), the actually realized hexagonal patterns show no intersecting circles and therefore cannot be ascribed to those.

Teaching
From 1972 he has been a professor at the Universidad Autonoma of Central America, Universidad of Costa Rica, Universidad de las Ciencias y el Arte, Mons. Odio, School, San Agustín University and others, in different subjects and careers:
Mathematics in several levels and careers,
Architecture Semiotics,
Architecture Field Theory,
Architectonic Design,
Communication Theory for Advertising Design Career,
Besides he is a tutor, reader and advisory of Thesis in various careers. He is recognized in the academic area because of his effort in forming professionals concerned with solidarity and social responsibility.

Conferencing
Gives conferences on bio climatic architecture, geotecture, sustainable construction, green building, cultural heritage, art, architecture, and pedagogue in different congresses, symposiums, universities and forums, with emphasis in the socially coexistence responsible and the biodiversity protection.

Business administrator
He is specialized in the social and solidarity function of the work, with programming emphasis, goals definition and human resources valuation, within the frame of a “culture of solid and shared company”. The social ethics is the central subject of its course Theory of the Communication, for the publicity career. He has written articles on “symbiosis and commensalism in the trade ", “loves and hatred for a product in study ", “the proxemic and the efficiency in the offices”, educative administration, etc. It is possible to mention its gratuitous collaboration with other causes like:
indigenous associations and farmers: generating activities productive which they improve its standard of life, like alternative to operation of forest and the emigration to the city,
of center and old centers attention of attention stop people infected with AIDS, with the objective to canalize social solidarity towards sectors unprotected.

References

Literature

 
 

Specialized magazines

External links
Official web site of Ibo Bonilla
Official web site of CFIA
Colegio de Arquitectos de Costa Rica
Centro Cultural ETC, Galería en Línea
Su Casa, Revista de Arquitectura y Diseño

1951 births
Living people
People from Sarchí (canton)
Costa Rican architects
Costa Rican sculptors
Technical University of Valencia alumni
Solar building designers
Spanish architects
Spanish sculptors
Spanish male sculptors